A list of films produced in Russia in 2009 (see 2009 in film).

2009

See also
 2009 in Russia

References

External links
 Russian films of 2009 at the Internet Movie Database

2009
Films
Lists of 2009 films by country or language